The Moore SS-1 is an American high-wing, single seat, FAI Standard Class glider that was designed and constructed by Arien C. Moore of Sweet Home, Oregon.

Design and development
Moore built the SS-1 over a period of just under three years, completing it in 1966, with assistance from his wife and son.

The SS-1 is of predominantly aluminium construction, with the wing partly covered with sheet aluminium and partly with doped aircraft fabric covering. The aircraft also has some fiberglass fairings. The entire aircraft is flush riveted, except the aft fuselage. The cantilever semi-tapered wing is of a  span and employs a NACA 65-618 airfoil. The wing features DFS-style dive brakes. The landing gear is a fixed monowheel that is faired. The cockpit canopy is optional and the aircraft can be flown open cockpit.

The aircraft cost just under US$3000 to complete in 1966. It was donated to the US Southwest Soaring Museum, where it is on display.

Operational history
The SS-1 was featured on the cover of the Soaring Society of America's January 1974 issue of Soaring Magazine.

Aircraft on display
US Southwest Soaring Museum

Specifications (SS-1)

See also

References

1960s United States sailplanes
Homebuilt aircraft
Aircraft first flown in 1966